Hans in Every Street is a 1930 German crime film directed by Carl Froelich and starring Hans Albers, Camilla Horn, and Betty Amann. A separate French-language version was also released.

The film's sets were designed by the art director Franz Schroedter.

Cast

References

Bibliography

External links 
 

1930 films
1930s crime thriller films
Films of the Weimar Republic
German crime thriller films
1930s German-language films
Films directed by Carl Froelich
1930s chase films
Films about journalists
German multilingual films
Films set in Berlin
Films set in Switzerland
Films set in France
Films set on the French Riviera
German black-and-white films
1930 multilingual films
1930s German films